Franco Morzone (born September 7, 1918 in Turin) was an Italian professional football player.

1918 births
Year of death missing
Italian footballers
Serie A players
Juventus F.C. players
Footballers from Turin
Association football forwards